The 2012-13 Glasgow Warriors season saw the team participate in competitions including the RaboDirect Pro12 and the European Rugby Champions Cup.

Season Overview

Team

Coaches

  Gregor Townsend Head Coach
  Gavin Vaughan Head Performance Analyst

Squad

Academy players

  Fergus Scott - Hooker
  George Hunter - Prop
  Jonny Gray - Lock
  Adam Ashe - Flanker
  Callum Templeton - Number Eight

  Murray McConnell - Scrum-half
  Sean Kennedy - Scrum-half
  James Johnstone - Centre
  Bruce Dick - Centre
  Fraser Thomson - Wing

Player statistics

During the 2012–13 season, Glasgow used 51 different players in competitive games. The table below shows the number of appearances and points scored by each player.

Staff movements

Coaches

Personnel In

  Gregor Townsend from  Scotland (Asst).
  Gavin Vaughan from  Aironi Performance Analyst

Personnel Out

 Sean Lineen to Scottish Rugby Union (Head of Player Acquisition)

Player movements

Academy promotions

Player transfers

In

Out

  Rob McAlpine to  Edinburgh Rugby
  Colin Shaw to  Scotland 7s

Competitions

Pre-season and friendlies

Match 1

Castres: 

Glasgow Warriors: 15 Peter Murchie; 14 Tommy Seymour, 13 Byron McGuigan, 12 Troy Nathan, 11 Fraser Thomson; 10 Scott Wight, 9 Murray McConnell; 1 Gordon Reid, 2 Finlay Gillies, 3 Ed Kalman, 4 Nick Campbell, 5 Tim Swinson, 6 Angus Macdonald, 7 Chris Fusaro (CAPTAIN), 8 Adam Ashe

Substitutes: 16 Pat MacArthur, 17 Moray Low, 18 George Hunter, 19 Andrew Redmayne, 20 Ryan Wilson, 21 Henry Pyrgos, 22 Ruaridh Jackson, 23 Alex Dunbar, 24 George Graham, 25 Taylor Paris, 26 Mike Cusack

Match 2

Sale Sharks: 15 Rob Miller; 14 Charlie Amesbury, 13 Will Addison, 12 Johnny Leota, 11 Tom Brady; 10 Nick MacLeod, 9 Cillian Willis; 1 Eifion Lewis-Roberts, 2 Joe Ward, 3 Tony Buckley, 4 Fraser McKenzie, 5 James Gaskell, 6 Mark Easter, 7 David Seymour (CAPTAIN), 8 Richie Vernon

Replacements: 16 Marc Jones, 17 Vadim Cobilas, Aston Croall, 18 Ross Harrison, 19 Richie Gray, Tom Holmes, 20 James Doyle, 21 Dwayne Peel, 22 Danny Cipriani, 23 Jordan Davies, Corne Uys, Charlie Ingall

Glasgow Warriors: 15 Peter Murchie; 14 Tommy Seymour, 13 Byron McGuigan, 12 Alex Dunbar, 11 Taylor Paris; 10 Ruaridh Jackson, 9 Henry Pyrgos; 1 Gordon Reid, 2 Pat MacArthur, 3 Mike Cusack, 4 Tim Swinson, 5 Nick Campbell, 6 Angus Macdonald, 7 Chris Fusaro (CAPTAIN), 8 Ryan Wilson

Replacements (all used): 16 Finlay Gillies, 17 Moray Low, 18 Ed Kalman, 19 James Eddie, 20 Adam Ashe, 21 Troy Nathan, 22 Scott Wight, 23 Peter Horne, 24 Sean Kennedy, 25 Fraser Thomson, 26 George Hunter

Match 3

Glasgow Warriors: Gordon Reid, Finlay Gillies, Moray Low, Tom Ryder, Nick Campbell, Adam Ashe, John Barclay, Ryan Wilson, Henry Pyrgos, Duncan Weir, DTH van der Merwe, Peter Horne, Byron McGuigan, Tommy Seymour, Fraser Thomson
Replacements: (used:) Michael Cusack, George Hunter, James Eddie, Angus Macdonald, Chris Fusaro, Graeme Morrison, Peter Murchie, Scott Wight, Sean Kennedy, (not used:) Ryan Grant

Exeter Chiefs: P Dollman; J Tatupu, I Whitten (L Arscott 57), J Shoemark, M Jess; I Mieres (G Steenson 62), K Barrett (W Chudley h/t); B Sturgess (C Rimmer 65), C Whitehead (S Alcott 74), H Tui; T Hayes (capt, D Welch 71), A Muldowney (J Hanks 62); T Johnson (J Phillips 62), J Scaysbrook, R Baxter (B White 74).

European Champions Cup

Pool 4

Results

Round 1

Round 2

Round 3

Round 4

Round 5

Round 6

RaboDirect Pro12

League table

Results

Round 1

Round 2

Round 3

Round 4

Round 5

Round 6

Round 7

Round 8

Round 9

Round 10

Round 11: 1872 Cup (1st Leg)

Round 12: 1872 Cup (2nd Leg)

Glasgow Warriors won the 1872 Cup with an aggregate score of 44 - 31.

Round 13

Round 14

Round 15

Round 16

Round 17

Round 18

Round 19

Round 20

Round 21

Round 22

Playoffs

Semi-finals

End of Season awards

Competitive debuts this season

A player's nationality shown is taken from the nationality at the highest honour for the national side obtained; or if never capped internationally their place of birth. Senior caps take precedence over junior caps or place of birth; junior caps take precedence over place of birth. A player's nationality at debut may be different from the nationality shown. Combination sides like the British and Irish Lions or Pacific Islanders are not national sides, or nationalities.

Players in BOLD font have been capped by their senior international XV side as nationality shown.

Players in Italic font have capped either by their international 7s side; or by the international XV 'A' side as nationality shown.

Players in normal font have not been capped at senior level.

A position in parentheses indicates that the player debuted as a substitute. A player may have made a prior debut for Glasgow Warriors in a non-competitive match, 'A' match or 7s match; these matches are not listed.

Tournaments where competitive debut made:

Crosshatching indicates a jointly hosted match.

Sponsorship

Glasgow Airport - Partner

Official Kit Supplier

Canterbury

References

2012-13
2012–13 in Scottish rugby union
2012–13 Pro12 by team
2012–13 Heineken Cup by team